Lyle Reynolds Wheeler (February 2, 1905 – January 10, 1990) was an American motion picture art director. He received five Academy Awards — for Gone with the Wind (1939), Anna and the King of Siam (1946), The Robe (1953), The King and I (1956) and The Diary of Anne Frank (1959).

Biography
Lyle Wheeler studied at the University of Southern California, then worked as a magazine artist and industrial designer. In 1936, he was hired by David O. Selznick to work as a set designer for Selznick's motion picture production company. Wheeler proved able to design quality sets at reasonable costs and was very much in demand in the industry. By the end of World War II, Wheeler had joined 20th Century Fox, where he remained as chief art director until the end of the 1950s.

In a career spanning 40 years, Wheeler created sets for more than 350 motion pictures, many of which are considered film classics. His credits include A Star Is Born, A Tree Grows in Brooklyn, State Fair, The Dolly Sisters, Forever Amber, The Fan, The Pride of St. Louis, Titanic, The Seven Year Itch, and Carousel and in particular, Gone With the Wind, for which he drew some of the earliest examples of storyboards for film, illustrating not only the art design, but the framing, composition and even the color for nearly every shot in the film, greatly influencing the production. He also created matte paintings for all the ceilings for the sets as well as large set pieces like the facade of Tara. He was nominated for the Academy Award for Best Production Design 29 times, winning five. In 1951, he was nominated for four different films, three in 1952 and twice for two films in one year.

His television credits include the long-running CBS series, Perry Mason.

Late in life, Wheeler suffered financial reverses and was forced to sell his home. He lost his five Academy Award statuettes when he was unable to pay a bill in excess of $30,000 at a storage facility. His 1959 Oscar for The Diary of Anne Frank was purchased and returned to Wheeler in 1989 by a fan.

Lyle Wheeler died on January 10, 1990, at the Motion Picture & Television Country House and Hospital, of pneumonia. He was cremated, and his ashes stored in the vault at the Chapel of the Pines Crematory in Los Angeles.

Academy Awards
The art direction of Lyle Wheeler was often recognized by the Academy of Motion Picture Arts and Sciences.

Wins
1939: Gone with the Wind
1946: Anna and the King of Siam
1953: The Robe
1956: The King and I
1959: The Diary of Anne Frank

Nominations
1937: The Prisoner of Zenda
1938: The Adventures of Tom Sawyer
1940: Rebecca
1944: Laura
1945: Leave Her to Heaven
1947: The Foxes of Harrow
1949: Come to the Stable
1950: All About Eve
1951: Fourteen Hours, House on Telegraph Hill, David and Bathsheba, On the Riviera
1952: My Cousin Rachel, Viva Zapata!, The Snows of Kilimanjaro
1953: The President's Lady, Titanic
1954: Desirée
1955: Daddy Long Legs, Love Is a Many-Splendored Thing
1956: Teenage Rebel
1958: A Certain Smile
1959: Journey to the Center of the Earth
1963: The Cardinal

See also
 Art Directors Guild Hall of Fame

References

External links
 
"The Diary of Lyle Wheeler's Oscars Daniel Cerone, Los Angeles Times, February 8, 1989
 "His Oscars Gone with the Wind, Art Director Lyle Wheeler Fights to Regain More Than Statuettes" People, March 27, 1989

American art directors
Best Art Direction Academy Award winners
University of Southern California alumni
Burials at Chapel of the Pines Crematory
1990 deaths
1905 births
People from Woburn, Massachusetts
American production designers
20th Century Studios people
Deaths from pneumonia in California